Badminton is a Southeast Asian Games event and has been one of the sports held at the Games since the inaugural edition of the South East Asian Peninsular Games (SEAP Games) in 1959.

Summary

Medal table
As of the 2021 Southeast Asian Games

Performances by nation

Winners

Team competition

References
Badminton Asia: Past Tournament Results - SEA Games
Badminton.de: SEA Games 2003
http://tournamentsoftware.com/findtournament.aspx

 
Southeast Asian Games